Deyan Velkov (born 28 March 1981) is a Bulgarian footballer currently playing for Dunav Ruse as a forward.

External links 
  Profile

Bulgarian footballers
1981 births
Living people
FC Dunav Ruse players

Association football defenders